Les Ayvelles is a commune in the Ardennes department in the Grand Est region of northern France.

The inhabitants of the commune are known both as Ayvelliens or Ayvelliennes as well as Ayvellois or Ayvelloises.

Geography
Les Ayvelles is located just 5 km south-east of Charleville-Mézières. Access to the commune is by road D764 from Villers-Semeuse in the north which passes through the centre of the commune and the village and continues to Flize in the south. The commune has large reservoirs in the east and a forest in the west (the Bois des Ayvelles) with the rest of the commune farmland.

The Meuse river forms the eastern border of the commune as it flows north to Belgium. The Ruisseau du Pierge rises in the west of the commune and flows east to join the Meuse.

Neighbouring communes and villages

Heraldry

Administration

List of Successive Mayors

Demography
In 2017 the commune had 897 inhabitants.

Culture and heritage

Civil heritage
The Fort and Battery of Ayvelles. The Fort can be visited by appointment.

Religious heritage

The Parish Church of Saint Rémi contains several items that are registered as historical objects:
The Tombstone of Priest Ponce Guérin (1690)
A Baptismal font (12th century)
A Chalice with Paten (1750 and 1752)

See also
Communes of the Ardennes department

References

External links
Les Ayvelles on the old IGN website 
Les Ayvelles on Géoportail, National Geographic Institute (IGN) website 
les G-des-Ayvelles on the 1750 Cassini Map

Communes of Ardennes (department)